These lists show the audio and visual recordings of Il ritorno d'Ulisse in patria ("The Return of Ulysses to his Homeland") by Claudio Monteverdi. The opera was premièred in Venice in 1640, initially in five acts, and was then performed in Bologna before returning to Venice for the 1641–42 season. The music was subsequently lost; modern opera productions have been based on editions derived from the sole manuscript score, a three-act version discovered in Vienna in the 19th century. Performances were rare until the 1970s when the work entered the operatic mainstream after stagings in Vienna and at Glyndebourne, both of which were recorded. Since that date recordings have been issued regularly, in five-act, three-act, and two-act versions.

Recording history
The first recording of the opera was issued in 1964, a version incorporating substantial cuts. The first complete recording was that of Nikolaus Harnoncourt and Concentus Musicus Wien in 1971, the first of three Harnoncourt versions in audio and video. Raymond Leppard's 1972 Glyndebourne version was recorded in a concert performance in the Royal Albert Hall; the following year the same Glyndebourne cast was recorded in a full stage performance. These recordings were issued many years later, in compact disc and DVD format. Leppard's third Glyndebourne version was issued in 1980, the heavy orchestration with strings and brass drawing some adverse critical comments.

In 1978 Roger Norrington, with Kent Opera, recorded the only English language version of the opera. A two-act version prepared by the German composer Hans Werner Henze was performed under Jeffrey Tate at the 1985 Salzburg Festival and issued on videotape. After several years, the 1990s and 2000s saw a proliferation of recordings in audio and video formats, including performances under Alan Curtis, René Jacobs, Sergio Vartolo, and William Christie. More than thirty years after his first recording, Harnoncourt produced his 2002 version in DVD format, a live recording from Zurich Opera.

Audio

Video

References
Notes

Sources

 (registration required)

 

 

Opera discographies